Davitts GAA is a Gaelic Athletic Association club based in the parish of Kilvine in south County Mayo, Ireland.

History
Gaelic football was played in the parish since the end of the Civil War. In the early 1950s more concerted efforts were made to bring some organisation to football in the parish. The two teams of Irishtown and Ballindine amalgamated and affiliated in 1974.

Club name
Throughout the ‘50s and ‘60s the team played under the name ‘Ballindine’ at one point and ‘Irishtown’ at another. At one stage the name ‘St. Josephs’ was also used. Since the name of the club seemed to be a bone of contention at times, it was decided to try and settle on a name to unite both sides of the parish. At a meeting in the People’s Hall in Ballindine in 1974, it was decided that the club be named ‘Davitts’, from Michael Davitt of nearby Straide. Initially, this name was to be on a trial basis for one year but has lasted ever since.

Achievements
 All-Ireland Intermediate Club Football Championship: Runner-Up 2012
 Connacht Intermediate Club Football Championship: 2011
 Mayo Intermediate Football Championship 2011

Notable players
 Michael Conroy
 Colm Boyle

References

Gaelic football clubs in County Mayo
Gaelic games clubs in County Mayo